Giuseppina "Pepi" Fabbiano is an American astrophysicist.
She works in the High Energy Astrophysics Division, at the Smithsonian Astrophysical Observatory.

Life
She was born in Palermo, Italy.
She graduated from the University of Palermo. She studies black holes.

Works

References

External links
http://hea-www.cfa.harvard.edu/~pepi/
http://chandra.harvard.edu/blog/node/333

American astrophysicists
Living people
Year of birth missing (living people)
Italian astrophysicists
Scientists from Sicily